Acústico MTV is the third live album released by brazilian rock band Os Paralamas do Sucesso at the Parque Lage, in Brazil.

Track listing
All songs written by Herbert Vianna, except where noted:
"Vulcão Dub / Fui Eu" (Herbert Vianna, Bi Ribeiro, João Barone / Herbert Vianna) – 4:47
"O Trem da Juventude" – 3:46
"Manguetown" (Chico Science, Lúcio Maia, Dengue) – 2:43
"Um Amor, Um Lugar" – 3:05
"Bora-Bora" – 3:03
"Vai Valer" – 3:26
"I Feel Good / Sossêgo" (James Brown / Tim Maia) – 4:05
"Uns Dias" – 4:01
"Sincero Breu" (Pedro Luís, Celso Alvim, Mauro Moura, C.A, Sidon Silva, Herbert Vianna) – 3:28
"Meu Erro" – 3:09
"Selvagem" (Herbert Vianna, Bi Ribeiro, João Barone) – 2:29
"Brasília 5:31" – 2:58
"Tendo a Lua" (Herbert Vianna, Tetê Tillet) – 3:19
"Que País é Esse?" (Renato Russo) – 3:37
"Navegar Impreciso" – 4:23
"Feira Moderna" (Fernando Brant, Beto Guedes, Lô Borges) – 3:02
"Tequila / Lourinha Bombril" (Chuck Rio / Diego Blanco, Bahiano (version by Herbert Vianna) – 4:16
"Vamo Batê Lata" – 3:49
"Life During Wartime" (David Byrne) – 4:19
"Nebulosa do Amor" – 3:23
"Caleidoscópio" – 4:16

Personnel
Herbert Vianna – vocals, acoustic guitar, 12-string guitar; semi-acoustic guitar in "I Feel Good / Sossêgo"
Bi Ribeiro – acoustic bass guitar
João Barone – drums, percussion
 João Fera - digital piano; cowbell in "Selvagem", tambourine in "Brasília 5:31"
 Eduardo Lyra - percussion
 José Monteiro Junior - tenor sax
 Demétrio Bezerra - trumpet
 Bidu Cordeiro - trombone; cowbell in "O Trem da Juventude"
Dado Villa-Lobos – acoustic guitar, viola caipira; semi-acoustic guitar with e-bow in "Brasília 5:31"
Zizi Possi – vocals in "Meu Erro"

Awards
2000: Latin Grammy Award for Best Brazilian Rock Album

Certification

References

MTV Unplugged albums
Os Paralamas do Sucesso live albums
1999 live albums
EMI Records live albums
Latin Grammy Award for Best Portuguese Language Rock or Alternative Album